The TIMED (Thermosphere • Ionosphere • Mesosphere • Energetics and Dynamics) mission is dedicated to study the influences energetics and dynamics of the Sun and humans on the least explored and understood region of Earth's atmosphere – the Mesosphere and Lower Thermosphere / Ionosphere (MLTI). The mission was launched from Vandenberg Air Force Base in California on 7 December 2001 aboard a Delta II rocket launch vehicle. The project is sponsored and managed by NASA, while the spacecraft was designed and assembled by the Applied Physics Laboratory at Johns Hopkins University. The mission has been extended several times, and has now collected data over an entire solar cycle, which helps in its goal to differentiate the Sun's effects on the atmosphere from other effects. TIMED Was Launched Alongside Jason-1.

Atmospheric region under study 

This can have profound effects on Earth's upper atmospheric regions, particularly during the peak of the Sun's 11-year solar cycle when the greatest amounts of its energy are being released. Understanding these interactions is also important for our understanding of various subjects in geophysics, meteorology, aeronomy, and atmospheric science, as solar radiation is one of the primary driving forces behind atmospheric tides. Changes in the MLT can also affect modern satellite and radio telecommunications.

Scientific instruments 
The spacecraft payload consists of the following four main instruments:

 Global Ultraviolet Imager (GUVI), which scans cross track from horizon to horizon to measure the spatial and temporal variations of temperature and constituent densities in the lower thermosphere, and to determine the importance of auroral energy sources and solar extreme ultraviolet sources to the energy balance in that region.
 Solar Extreme ultraviolet Experiment (SEE), a spectrometer and a suite of photometers designed to measure the solar soft X-rays, extreme-ultraviolet and far-ultraviolet radiation that is deposited into the MLT region.
 TIMED  Doppler Interferometer (TIDI), designed to globally measure the wind and temperature profiles of the MLT region.
 Sounding of the Atmosphere using Broadband Emission Radiometry (SABER), multichannel radiometer designed to measure heat emitted by the atmosphere over a broad altitude and spectral range, as well as global temperature profiles and sources of atmospheric cooling.

The data collected by the satellite's instruments are made freely available to the public.

Specifications 

 Mass: 660 kilograms
 Dimensions:
 2.72 meters high
 1.61 meters wide (launch configuration)
 11.73 meters wide (solar arrays deployed)
 1.2 meters deep
 Power consumption: 406 watts
 Data downlink: 4 megabits per second
 Memory: 5 gigabits
 Control and data handling processor: Mongoose-V
 Attitude:
 Control - Within 0.50°
 Knowledge - Within 0.03°
 Processor: RTX2010
 Total mission cost:
 Spacecraft: US$195 million  
 Ground operations: US$42 million

Satellite operations 
TIMED experienced minor problems with attitude control when, after launch, the magnetorquers failed to slow the spacecraft's spin as intended. An engineer installing the magnetorquers had mistakenly recorded the reverse of their actual polarities, which generated a sign error in the flight software. The problem was fixed by temporarily disabling the orbiter's magnetic field sensor and uploading a software patch to fix the sign error. In a separate incident, another software update fixed a problem caused by faulty testing of the sun sensors. After these corrections, the attitude control system functioned as intended.

Scientific results 

TIMED has improved scientific understanding of long-term trends in the upper atmosphere. The SABER instrument has collected a continuous record of water vapor and carbon dioxide levels in the stratosphere and mesosphere.

SABER is able to collect 1,500 water vapor measurements per day, a vast improvement from previous satellites and ground-based observations. SABER had a flaw in its optical filter that caused it to overestimate water vapor levels; this error was discovered and the data were corrected. Based on the corrected data, SABER found that between 2002 and 2018, water vapor levels in the lower stratosphere were increasing at an average rate of 0.25 ppmv (around 5%) per decade, and in the upper stratosphere and mesosphere, water vapor levels were increasing at an average rate of 0.1-0.2 ppmv (around 2-3%) per decade. Growth in methane levels is thought to be partially responsible for the growth in water vapor levels, as methane decomposes into carbon dioxide and water vapor, but changes driven by the solar cycle may also be responsible.

SABER has also monitored carbon dioxide levels in the upper atmosphere.

By collecting upper atmosphere data, TIMED assists the modeling of environmental impacts. Water vapor and carbon dioxide are greenhouse gases and their growth in the upper atmosphere must be factored into climate models. Additionally, upper atmosphere water vapor contributes to ozone depletion.

Instrument teams

United States 

 University of Alaska, Fairbanks, Alaska
 University of California, Berkeley, California
 Jet Propulsion Laboratory, Pasadena, California
 University of Colorado, Boulder, Colorado
 National Center for Atmospheric Research, Boulder, Colorado
 National Oceanic and Atmospheric Administration, Boulder, Colorado
 The Johns Hopkins University Applied Physics Laboratory, Laurel, Maryland
 Air Force Research Laboratory, Hanscom Air Force Base, Massachusetts
 Stewart Radiance Laboratory, Bedford, Massachusetts
 University of Michigan, Ann Arbor, Michigan
 Southwest Research Institute, San Antonio, Texas
 Utah State University, Logan, Utah
 Hampton University, Hampton, Virginia
 Computational Physics, Inc., Fairfax, Virginia
 Naval Research Laboratory, Washington, D.C.
 NASA Langley Research Center, Hampton, Virginia
 G&A Technical Software Inc., Hampton, Virginia

International 
 Hovemere Limited, Kent, England, United Kingdom
 British Antarctic Survey, Cambridge, England, United Kingdom
 CREES-York University, Toronto, Ontario, Canada
 Astrophysical Institute of Andalucia (IAA), Granada, Spain
 Rostock University, Rostock, Germany

See also 

 Upper Atmosphere Research Satellite, 1991-2005

References

Further reading

External links 
 TIMED mission page at JHU/APL
 TIMED mission page at NASA GSFC
 Solar EUV Experiment (SEE) page at the Laboratory for Atmospheric and Space Physics

Earth observation satellites of the United States
NASA satellites
University of Colorado Boulder
Ionosphere
Spacecraft launched in 2001
Spacecraft launched by Delta II rockets